Ustad Noor Khan Bizanjo (Balochi:
استاد نورخان بزنجو; December 4 1969  August 5 2003), was a prominent Balochi musician. He was a one-of-a-kind singer who made his name by getting expertise in modern and classical modes of Balochi music. There are two books of poetry Baam Range Sadaf (Urdu) and Hayal a Chanddan.

Early life
Bizanjo was born in the small coastal town of Pasni, in Makran, Balochistan in December 1969 or January 1970. He completed his matriculation from his native city of Pasni and later moved to the neighbouring city of Turbat, where he studied Fine Arts, resulting in a Bachelor of Arts degree. He then went to Quetta, the capital of Balochistan, where he completed postgraduate education specialising in Arts. After completing his education, he was appointed as a teacher in a government school in Pasni.Then his father send him to Karachi university.

Musical career
His love for Balochi music brought him back to his city where he started to take courses from prominent Balochi musicians such as Ustad Abdul Sattar Baloch and Wali Mohammad Baloch. In a short time, he became a near-expert and released his first album Sheerkynein Yaat and later on released a few more. Later on, he started the dual style of Balochi music with Arif Baloch who is another famous Balochi singer. These albums became hits and both singers were admired for their work. Some of his famous albums are Alhaan, Aadeink and Zaheerani Razan.

Death and legacy
Bizanjo died on 5 August 2003 at Turbat, Balochistan.

References

2003 deaths
People from Balochistan, Pakistan
1969 births
Baloch male singers
20th-century Pakistani male singers